Jacques Secretin (28 December 1907 – 29 December 1978) was a Belgian footballer. He played in three matches for the Belgium national football team from 1930 to 1931.

References

External links
 

1907 births
1978 deaths
Belgian footballers
Belgium international footballers
Place of birth missing
Association footballers not categorized by position